Obrera is a station along Line 8 of the metro of Mexico City. The station is situated on Eje Central Lázaro Cárdenas. The station's logo is a construction worker's helmet framed with two gears. The name obrera comes from the Colonia Obrera neighborhood where the station is located.

From 23 April to 18 June 2020, the station was temporarily closed due to the COVID-19 pandemic in Mexico.

Ridership

References

External links 
 

Obrera
Railway stations opened in 1994
1994 establishments in Mexico
Mexico City Metro stations in Cuauhtémoc, Mexico City